Nawab Sir Muhammad Faiyaz Ali Khan Bahadur  (1851–1922) was a Nawab of Pahasu, a member of the Governor General's Council of the United Provinces of Agra and Oudh and Member of the Legislative council of the United Provinces.

Early life
Faiyaz Ali Khan was born to Sir Muhammad Faiz Ali Khan in 1851 in a Muslim Rajput family belonging to Lalkhani branch.

He had two wives and had 3 children from his first wife and one child from 2nd wife  Khan.

Positions
1898-1902: Member of Legislative council of United Provinces
1898-1900: Member of Governors General's  Legislative council

Khan was appointed Foreign Minister of Jaipur State Council in 1901 of Maharaja Sawai Madho Singh II (1880-1922).

In 1902, he was chosen to represent the United Provinces of Agra and Oudh at the coronation in London of King Edward VII and Queen Alexandra.

Honours and decorations
January 1903: Companion of the Order of the Star of India (CSI)
June 1907: Knight Commander of the Order of the Indian Empire (KCIE)
December 1911: Knight Commander of the Royal Victorian Order (KCVO)
January 1919: Commander of the Order of the British Empire (CBE)

He was honoured with the titles of Khan Bahadur and  Mumtaz-ud-Daula.

Philanthropy
He was noted for his philanthropic works and had devoted a large estate for charitable purpose. He also founded an Anglo-vernacular school at Pahasu in 1899. He had donated large amount for public and charitable purposes.

He also build the Mumtaz hostel of Aligarh Muslim University. And it is named after his name only. He also served as President of Board of Trustees of Aligarh Muslim University.

See also
 Pahasu

References

 

1851 births
1922 deaths
People from Bulandshahr
Administrators in the princely states of India
Indian Muslims
Indian nobility
Indian philanthropists
Founders of Indian schools and colleges
Knights Commander of the Order of the Indian Empire
Knights Commander of the Royal Victorian Order
Companions of the Order of the Star of India
Indian Commanders of the Order of the British Empire
Indian Knights Commander of the Royal Victorian Order